Kozhencherry is a census town in Pathanamthitta district of Central Travancore region (South Central Kerala) in Kerala state, India.  census, the population was 12,021 of which 5,594 are males while 6,427 are females.

History
Kozhencherry is situated in the central Travancore and in the centre of Pathanamthitta District. It is on the bank of the Holy river Pampa (it descends from Sabarimala) and blessed by hills and green valleys. It is a very beautiful place. The history of Kozhencherry is very closely related to the history of the Central Travancore State. Kozhencherry was one among the five major towns in the earstwhile Travancore. It is model of communal harmony.

Kozhencherry is a very fertile land and cultivating plantations, paddy, tapioca, coconut, rubber, pepper, sugar cane, vegetables, spices etc. From Kozhencherry market goods were marketed to Kochi and Alapuzha through the river Pampa in big boats in olden days. In the year 1869 at the time of the rule of Sree Moolam Thirunal the resident Mr. G.A. Bellard started a public market, later it is called Bellard Public Market. So we can understand that Kozhencherry played an important role in ancient trading itself. Kozhencherry was very closely related to banking and co-operative societies. Malankara Syndicate Bank was one among the pioneers in the Travancore.

On 11 May 1935 Sri. C Keshavan, in a public meeting at Kozhencherry, demanded to open roads and schools to the public and to stop the rule of Divanji and form a democratic rule. It influenced the public to participate in the Freedom Struggle with Mahatma Gandhi. For that he was arrested and put him in to jail. For the memory of this event one momentum on stone is erected in the center of the Kozhencherry Town.

In the field of education, Kozhencherry made available contribution to the central Travancore. In 1910 St. Thomas High School was started. Student of various places came here for their schooling. In 1953 St. Thomas College was started. By considering the importance of the Kozhencherry a District Hospital was started before 112 years ago by the rulers.Kozhencherry Panchayath was formed in 1953. Before the Kozhencherry Village Union was formed on 16-7-1948. The total area of Kozhencherry Panchayath is 861.41 hector. The population of Kozhencherry panchayath was 12701 (Men 6093, Women 6608) in the 1991 senses.

Kozhencherry has its own highlights in sports and games. Volleyball was started in the beginning of 20th century itself. Kozhencherry contributed players even to Indian teams and national levels. The Janatha Sports Club is conducting a All India Volley Ball Tournament. The Horty Cultural Society is holding a flower show every year.

In the field of social organisation Rotary club, Lion's Club, Y's men club, Junior chamber, YMCA, YWCA, Y's Men, Fine Arts Society and many other societies and clubs are working at Kozhencherry. People from Kozhencherry is working all over the world in good positions and helping the economic growth of our country.

Geography
The total area of this village includes hill areas, plane lands, semi hill areas and paddy fields

Climate

Administration 
Kozhencherry  is part of the Pathanamthitta district. Before the formation of the Pathanamthitta district in 1982, Kozhencherry  belonged to the Idukki and Kollam district border.

Tourism
The very famous Maramon Convention conducted in this village at the sand bed of pampa river. The statue of C. KESAVAN, famous for Kozhencherry speech during Freedom Fight is very near to Village office. District Tourism Promotion Council (DTPC) office is in Kozhencherry village near Panchayath stadium. There is no other tourism spot in this village.

Education
 St. Thomas College, Kozhencherry
 St. Mary's Girls High School, Kozhencherry
 St. Thomas Higher Secondary School, Kozhencherry
 Marthoma Senior Secondary School, Kozhencherry

Transport
Kozhencherry  is largely dependent on private buses and most long-route Kerala State Road Transport Corporation (KSRTC) buses. There is a KSRTC bus depot in Kozhencherry  adjacent to the private   bus stand.  Auto rickshaws are also available and are generally hired for short distances (1–3 km) where bus services are lacking. Jeeps are another preferred mode of transport where the terrain is hilly or rugged.

Hospitals
 Poyanil Hospital
 Mulamoottil Eye Hospital & Research Center
 Muthoot Hospitals Kozhencherry
 District Hospital, Kozhencherry

Notable people
 Mathai George Muthoot  - entrepreneur and businessman
 George Alexander Muthoot - entrepreneur and businessman
 M. G. George Muthoot - entrepreneur and businessman

See also
 Kozhencherry East
 Pathanamthitta District

References

Cities and towns in Pathanamthitta district